Maven Klint Huffman (born November 26, 1976) is an American  professional wrestler and television personality best known for his time with WWE under his first name. He is known for co-winning the inaugural season of Tough Enough alongside Nidia Guenard. He also became a three-time WWE Hardcore Champion.

Professional wrestling career

World Wrestling Federation/Entertainment

Tough Enough and Hardcore Champion (2001–2002)
Huffman began his professional wrestling career in 2001 upon being selected to participate in the inaugural season of Tough Enough, a reality television show used by the World Wrestling Federation (WWF) to find new WWF stars. Ultimately, Maven would become the co-winner of the competition alongside Nidia Guenard, and he was sent to the Heartland Wrestling Association (HWA) to receive further training.

On the October 4 episode of SmackDown!, Maven made his in-ring debut against Tazz, one of his Tough Enough trainers, who forced him to submit to the Tazzmission. Following the match, Tazz helped Maven to his feet before clotheslining him, thus starting a feud between the two. After losing to Tazz via submission in a rematch the following week on SmackDown!, Maven clotheslined Tazz following the match. On the October 18 episode of SmackDown!, Maven won his first wrestling match as he defeated Tazz with assistance from Tough Enough co-winner Nidia Guenard. Following this brief feud, Maven began a feud with The Undertaker after he eliminated Undertaker from the 2002 Royal Rumble by dropkicking him from behind; Undertaker responded in turn by returning to the ring, eliminating Maven. He proceeded to hit him with a steel chair, and beating him all the way back to the concession stand area.

On the January 28, 2002, episode of Raw, Maven was awarded a title bout by WWF co-owner Ric Flair against Chris Jericho for the Undisputed WWF Championship by virtue of never actually being eliminated from the Royal Rumble, but lost after submitting to the Walls of Jericho. After the match, Maven was attacked by The Undertaker. On the February 7 episode of SmackDown!, Maven faced Undertaker for his WWF Hardcore Championship, and after interference from The Rock and his Tough Enough trainer Al Snow, Maven defeated Undertaker to win the Hardcore Championship, the first championship of his career. Their feud ended after The Undertaker defeated Maven and Al Snow in a 2-on-1 handicap match when The Undertaker made Maven submit to the Dragon Sleeper. At WrestleMania X8, Maven lost the Hardcore Championship to Spike Dudley during a match with Goldust due to the title's unique 24/7 rule, but won the title back the same night from Christian due to the same rule. The following night on Raw, Maven was attacked by a debuting Brock Lesnar during his Hardcore Championship defense against Al Snow and Spike Dudley. Maven was the tenth pick for SmackDown! in the WWF draft due to being the Hardcore Champion, but he was punished by Vince McMahon after he lost the title to Raven on the March 28 episode of SmackDown!. Maven was traded to the Raw brand on November 4, 2002, where he confronted Christopher Nowinski with his former trainer Al Snow.

Mid-card status and feud with Evolution (2003–2004)
Maven entered the 2003 Royal Rumble. He attempted to eliminate The Undertaker by using a dropkick like he did the previous year, but failed and was eliminated by The Undertaker. Maven fought World Heavyweight Champion Triple H on the March 10 episode of Raw, but lost. In 2004, Maven received  the biggest push in his career, even gaining a victory over then-Evolution member Batista. Maven then took part in an Elimination Match at Survivor Series, teaming with Randy Orton, Chris Benoit, and Chris Jericho to face Triple H, Batista, Gene Snitsky, and Edge for the power to control Raw for one month. Maven was attacked backstage by Snitsky prior to the match, but after Benoit was eliminated, Maven arrived to join his teammates. He was eventually eliminated by Triple H. Orton was the sole survivor and as a result, he and his team had control of Raw for one month.

Maven was the first to control Raw, booking himself in a World Heavyweight Championship match against Triple H on the November 15 episode of Raw, who tried to get out of it by offering Maven a place in Evolution. He declined, but despite interference from Jericho, Benoit, and Orton, Triple H retained the title due to interference from Snitsky and Ric Flair.

Various feuds and departure (2004–2005)
On the November 29 episode of Raw, Maven competed in a battle royal to determine the number one contender for the World Heavyweight Championship, but was eliminated by Eugene. The following week on Raw, Maven faced Eugene in a singles match, which he lost by disqualification after attacking Eugene's injured knee during the match before choking him out. After the match, Maven attacked Eugene's tag team partner William Regal as Regal came to help him, thus turning heel in the process.

Following this, Maven began feuding with Shelton Benjamin over Benjamin's Intercontinental Championship, culminating at New Year's Revolution in a singles match for the title. Before the start of the match, Maven proceeded to blast the Puerto Rican crowd before Benjamin quickly defeated him in just a matter of minutes by using a roll-up. Maven then cut a promo on Benjamin, stating that the match "didn't count", and challenged him to a re-match. Benjamin accepted, and Maven was defeated in only seconds yet again following the T-Bone Suplex.

Following his feud with Benjamin, Maven formed a tag team with Simon Dean, where he acted as a dedicated user of Dean's "Simon System" brand of nutritional products. After being jobbers for a month, at Backlash, Maven and Simon Dean competed in a Tag Team Turmoil match for the World Tag Team Championship which was won by The Hurricane and Rosey. The team came to an end when Dean was traded to the SmackDown! brand, while Maven was subsequently released by WWE on July 5, 2005.

Independent circuit and TNA (2005–2007)
On November 19, 2005, Maven wrestled his first match following his WWE departure, where he lost to Slyck Wagner Brown via disqualification in a match for NWA Cyberspace. On February 10, 2006, Maven joined United Wrestling Federation Live and teamed alongside Jeff Jarrett to defeat Team 3D. On March 31, 2006, Maven wrestled his first match for Total Nonstop Action Wrestling, where he and Jarrett lost to Jeff Hardy and Kip James in a tag team match. After wrestling sporadically for the UWF and on house shows for TNA throughout the year, Maven wrestled his final match on October 5, 2007, where he lost to Test in a match for Full Throttle Wrestling.

Independent circuit (2015–2022)
On July 11, 2015, Maven announced his return to pro wrestling. His return match took place at Brian Myers' Create A Pro Wrestling Academy in Long Island, New York on July 19, 2015. Maven teamed with Johnny Clash to defeat The Warren Cousins (Mikey Warren and TJ Warren) in his first match since 2007.

On September 26, 2015, Maven teamed with Brian Myers in a losing effort against The Cam-An Connection (Anthony Greene and Cam Zagami).

On April 16, 2016, Maven teamed with Myers and Pat Buck in a six man tag team match losing to Aesthetic Males (Beefcake Charlie, Damian Gibbs and Mike Del) in a match for the WrestlePro promotion. He has not wrestled since 2016.

Currently Maven is the manager for rising star and ISPW Champion Justin Corino. He previously was the manager for the superstar Danny Morrison, where he also managed the wrestler who held the Heavyweight Championship.

Television career
In July 2005, Huffman was featured in episode three of MTV's The 70s House where he and other WWE wrestlers competed in a game of dodge ball.

In March 2006, it was announced by VH1 that Huffman would be a participant in the sixth season of The Surreal Life. On the first episode, he was picked by the existing castmates as the seventh and final cast member in a "15 More Minutes of Fame Reality Hunk Pageant," beating four other reality "hunks", including former American Idol contestant Corey Clark.

Subsequently, Huffman was a host for a show on BET J called BET's J List. He also appeared on the Home Shopping Network's weekday morning show, HSN Today, as its exercise and wellness expert as well as the co-host of HSN's NFL Pro Football Fan Shop.

Filmography

Personal life
Huffman's father is African-American and his mother was Argentinian. After his mother died, he was adopted by his maternal uncle and his wife. According to fellow professional wrestler Konnan, Huffman is his nephew. On July 29, 2021, Maven stated during an interview with Chris Van Vliet that he’s not related to Konnan. Huffman graduated from Wilson Memorial High School in Fishersville, Virginia before attending Eastern Mennonite University. Prior to becoming a professional wrestler, Huffman was a middle school teacher at Twality Middle School in Tigard, Oregon.

On April 2, 2012, Huffman was arrested in Florida after police revealed that he was doctor shopping due to an addiction to oxycodone and hydrocodone. He was released on a $2,000 bond and faced up to 5 years in prison if convicted of doctor shopping. On April 11, Huffman revealed that he was seeking help for his addiction and underwent WWE's former talent rehabilitation program.
 
In September 2013, Huffman was working as a bouncer in New York City.

Maven was an account executive with the Brooklyn Nets basketball team until September 2019.

On July 29, 2021, Maven stated during an interview with Chris Van Vliet that he now works in Finance, specifically on Wall Street.

Championships and accomplishments
Figure Wrestling Federation
FWF Tough Enough Trophy (1 time, current)
Pro Wrestling Illustrated
PWI Rookie of the Year (2002)
PWI ranked him #88 of the Top 500 singles wrestlers in the PWI 500 in 2003
World Wrestling Federation
WWF Hardcore Championship (3 times)
Tough Enough I - with Nidia Guenard

References

External links 

 
 
 
 

1976 births
African-American male professional wrestlers
American male professional wrestlers
Schoolteachers from Oregon
Eastern Mennonite University alumni
Living people
American television personalities
People from Augusta County, Virginia
Sportspeople from Charlottesville, Virginia
Participants in American reality television series
Professional wrestlers from Virginia
Tough Enough contestants
Tough Enough winners
American people of Argentine descent
WWF/WWE Hardcore Champions
21st-century African-American sportspeople
20th-century African-American sportspeople
21st-century professional wrestlers